Khun Hajji (also Romanized as Khūn Ḩājjī) is a village in Kuh Mareh Sorkhi Rural District, Arzhan District, Shiraz County, Fars Province, Iran. At the 2006 census, its population was 19, in 5 families.

References 

Populated places in Shiraz County